Dr. Adal Soomro (born Abdul Karim Soomro, 15 August 1955) is a Sindhi language poet and retired academician. He was Director Shaikh Ayaz Chair at Shah Abdul Latif University in Khairpur, Pakistan.

He holds a Ph.D. in the history of Sindhi Adabi Sangat, a Pakistani literary organization for which he has also been Secretary.

Soomro has written 12 books : one book of prose, three poetry collections, and eight works of children's literature and poetry. When asked about writing in other languages, he explained that because people dream in their native tongue, they express themselves most effectively through it and that preferring to work in a different language would leave his own vulnerable. Commenting on the longevity of poetic works, and on the challenges young poets face, he said they must combine artistic merit with thought while avoiding becoming repetitive.

Views
Adal Soomro advocates the abolition of the feudal system to empower women. Adal Soomro strongly condemns terrorism. Following the 2015 Jacobabad bombing, while expressing grief he criticized the law enforcement agencies for the security lapse.

References

Living people
Pakistani poets
1955 births
Sindhi-language poets